Botanique, the French word for botany, may refer to:
 Botanique/Kruidtuin metro station, a metro station in Brussels
 Le Botanique, a cultural complex in Brussels opened in 1984 on the site of the Botanical Garden

See also 
 Botanic (disambiguation)
 Botanical garden (disambiguation)
 Botany (disambiguation)